1154 Astronomia, provisional designation , is a carbonaceous background asteroid from the outer regions of the asteroid belt, approximately 60 kilometers in diameter. It was discovered by German astronomer Karl Reinmuth at the Heidelberg-Königstuhl State Observatory on 8 February 1927. The asteroid was named for the natural science of astronomy.

Orbit and classification 

Astronomia is a background asteroid, that is, not a member of any known asteroid family. It orbits the Sun in the outer main-belt at a distance of 3.2–3.6 AU once every 6 years and 3 months (2,281 days). Its orbit has an eccentricity of 0.07 and an inclination of 5° with respect to the ecliptic.

The body's observation arc begins the night after its official discovery observation at Heidelberg.

Physical characteristics 

In the Tholen classification, Astronomia has an ambiguous spectral type, closest to a carbonaceous F-type and somewhat similar to that of an X-type asteroid. Its spectrum has also been flagged as unusual and of poor quality (FXU:).

Rotation period 

In May 2016, the first rotational lightcurve of Astronomia was obtained from photometric observations. Lightcurve analysis gave a rotation period of 18.1154 hours with a brightness variation of 0.39 magnitude.

Diameter and albedo 

According to the surveys carried out by the Infrared Astronomical Satellite IRAS, the Japanese Akari satellite and the NEOWISE mission of NASA's Wide-field Infrared Survey Explorer, Astronomia measures between 55.4 and 64.20 kilometers in diameter and its surface has an albedo between 0.028 and 0.04.

The Collaborative Asteroid Lightcurve Link adopts the results obtained by IRAS, that is an albedo of 0.0296 and a diameter of 61.08 kilometers based on an absolute magnitude of 10.51.

Naming 

This minor planet was named after the natural science of astronomy, a study of celestial objects, observations and phenomena in the night sky. The official naming citation was mentioned in The Names of the Minor Planets by Paul Herget in 1955.

Notes

References

External links 
 Asteroid Lightcurve Database (LCDB), query form (info )
 Dictionary of Minor Planet Names, Google books
 Asteroids and comets rotation curves, CdR – Observatoire de Genève, Raoul Behrend
 Discovery Circumstances: Numbered Minor Planets (1)-(5000) – Minor Planet Center
 
 

001154
Discoveries by Karl Wilhelm Reinmuth
Named minor planets
001154
19270208